Daniella Pellegrini is a South African TV presenter, producer and dubbing artist.

Early life
Pellegrini was born in Johannesburg, South Africa and is the last of four children. She attended Rivonia Primary School where she began acting in school plays and later attended high school at Eden College in Hyde Park. Throughout her school career Pellegrini was a competitive gymnast and tumbler, representing her country internationally over the course of a decade. Pellegrini went on to study a communications degree at Rand Afrikaans University where she majored in Journalism, Human Movement Studies and Communications.

Career

Gymnastics and tumbling

Pellegrini started gymnastics & tumbling at the age of three and had a rewarding 16-year career. By the age of seven, Pellegrini was picked to join the Advanced Development Program, which was set up to groom and develop the next generation of Olympic athletes. While training as an all round artistic gymnast, Daniella's natural ability for tumbling began to show and in 1992 Pellegrini qualified for the 11th Tumbling & Trampoline World Championships/World Age group Games.

Due to the Apartheid government and international pressure, South Africa had been exiled from international sports competitions for almost a decade and Miss Pellegrini, alongside great tumblers like Tseko Mogotsi, was making history by being one of the first competitors to join the South African national team, to receive Springbok colours and to represent her country on an international platform. She went on to win a bronze medal at the 1992 World Age Group Games in Auckland, New Zealand.

Throughout the next decade of competing at an international level, Pellegrini represented her country on the national tumbling team earning South African National 8 times. She achieved many accolades and throughout her rewarding career she won 56 medals and 15 trophies, the greatest of these being the title of World Champion in her age group in 2001. In 2002 Pellegrini received a university scholarship based on her achievements.

Tumbling awards and titles

Fitness
After 8 years of retirement from international sport, Pellegrini rejoined the sporting arena as a competitive fitness athlete in 2010. She won her debut competition FAME UK 2010 as well as the 2010 Fitness Britain Fitness Championship, making her the Fitness Champion under two different competitive federations.

Fitness awards and titles

Broadcasting career

TV

Daniella's TV presenting career began in 1999 when she joined e-TV as a kids TV presenter on Craz-e. In 2003, Pellegrini joined Vicious Delicious, a magazine show that broadcast on DStv on channel 'GO', the country's first ever youth channel. Pellegrini interviewed world-famous DJs (Paul van Dyke, Paul Oakenfold, Ferry Corsten, Tim Deluxe) and famous bands like Sepultura. 
During her time on the show Daniella's antics included bunji jumping over Victoria Falls, snorkelling off the coast of Mozambique, helicopter flipping and white water rafting in Zambia, stunt flying, jet boating, drag racing, covering an FHM swimsuit calendar shoot and an MTV party to name but a few.

Radio

In 2002 while studying her bachelor's degree and working for RAU Radio, Pellegrini joined 5FM Music on an intense radio DJing training program after being chosen from 500 national entries. Later that year Pellegrini came runner up in the 94.7 Highveld Stereo Hot Jocks Competition, which was based by public votes. At the end of 2002 Pellegrini was offered to co-host a radio show on Edgars Music Radio. In 2003 Pellegrini was selected to be the anchor presenter on CNA Live. In 2004 Pellegrini signed with 94.7 Highveld Stereo as a presenter. In 2006 when Pellegrini relocated to London she joined the online station Radio SA.

Voice-over

Daniella's work as a voice artist includes TV promos, commercials, radio station IDs and promos corporate presentations for global brands and animated characters. In 2002, Pellegrini became the voice for SABC 1, which was at the time the public broadcast channel with the highest viewership figures. Pellegrini has voiced projects for/with global brands including Fox, FX, National Geographic, Fox Retro, NatGeo Wild, Sony Entertainment Television, Animax, Walt Disney, Nickelodeon, Ministry of Sound, BBC World, Guide Dogs, DStv, GO, Vicious Delicious, Sheer Dance, DJ Online, SAfm, Radio 2000, Rennies Travel, JNC, Garnier, and Laundry Monsters.

Acting and producing
In 1998 at age 16, Pellegrini joined the SABC in her first professional acting role on Sasko Sam, a children's educational fitness show and worked on other smaller productions as well as music and corporate videos. In 2006 when Pellegrini moved to London she continued to study acting, accents and comedy. She has worked on a number of short films including Strange Meeting and the feature Superman: Requiem.

In 2010 Pellegrini began producing and 8 months after she was cast in Superman: Requiem, she was invited to join the production team. Daniella's debut film as a producer 'Once Were' is an improvisational acting short. She currently has several projects in different stages of development.

Filmography

References

External links
 
 

1982 births
People from Johannesburg
South African television presenters
South African voice actresses
Living people
South African women television presenters